Lee Ho-seok (born March 1, 1993), known by his stage name Wonho, is a South Korean singer under Highline Entertainment. He is a former member of the South Korean boy group Monsta X, formed through the Mnet's survival show No.Mercy, under Starship Entertainment in 2015. He then made his solo debut, with his first EP Love Synonym Pt.1: Right for Me, on September 4, 2020.

Career

Early life and debut

Prior to his official debut, Wonho was part of a project group called Nu Boyz, along with his labelmates #Gun, Shownu and Jooheon, formed under Starship Entertainment in August 2014. The quartet uploaded multiple tracks to their company's YouTube channel and performed at the opening show of the Starship X concert on December 5, 2014.

In late December, Starship Entertainment and Mnet launched a competition program called No.Mercy. On the final episode of the show, Wonho was selected, along with six other participants, including Shownu and Jooheon (former members of Nu Boyz) as a member of Starship Entertainment's new boy group Monsta X.

2015–2019: Monsta X

Wonho debuted in Monsta X, a hip-hop boy group, upon the release of their first extended play Trespass, on May 14, 2015. Wonho was a vocalist in the group and beginning in 2017 regularly participated in writing, composing and arranging songs for the group.

Since 2018, Wonho has featured in several photoshoots for magazines, as well as partnering with some brands and promoting campaigns by various fashion magazines. He has appeared alongside his groupmates on several occasions, including Nylon, alongside Shownu in January 2018 and GQ in August, in both Ceci Korea in June 2018 and MAPS, with Minhyuk in December, lastly, Grazia, with Hyungwon in March 2019. He also participated in the collaboration project, with Elle and Tom Ford, alongside Shownu, in promotion of Tom Ford's latest perfume line in August 2019. He also made solo appearances, such as a feature in Dazed in November 2019.

Wonho has been recognized as the celebrity who focuses on fitness and physique, and in several interviews surrounding his photoshoots, he has talked about healthy habits, and emphasizing the importance of exercising. In October 2018, he partnered with Under Armour, as part of the collaboration with Dazed, to promote an active and healthy lifestyle. He again promoted healthy lifestyle, as part of a photoshoot for Elles "Body Challenge" campaign, in May 2019.

On October 31, Starship Entertainment announced Wonho's departure from Monsta X following allegations surrounding him, after rumors about the illegal use of marijuana when he was younger surfaced on social media.

2020: Solo debut with Love Synonym Pt.1: Right for Me and first solo concert 
On March 14, Starship Entertainment released an official statement announcing that the investigation made by the Seoul Metropolitan Police Agency's narcotics investigation team had been concluded; Wonho had been cleared of all allegations and the rumors were false.

Wonho signed with Highline Entertainment, a subsidiary of Starship Entertainment, as a solo artist on April 10. The agency announced that he would be promoting as a solo artist and producer going forward. On May 6, Maverick revealed through a Twitter post that they had signed a management agreement with Wonho for his international activities.

On August 9, Wonho announced the release of his first solo EP Love Synonym Pt.1: Right for Me. On August 14, he then released the pre-release English-language single "Losing You", along with its music video. "Losing You" gained praise for showing Wonho's all-around musicality, including his vocals, participation in the songwriting, composing, and producing of the song. The album was released on September 4 with the title track "Open Mind", accompanied by a music video. Wonho had his debut showcase the same day, hosted through V Live.

Wonho held his first solo concert on September 27. Due to restrictions from COVID-19, the concert was held online through the streaming platform LiveXLive. During his concert, Wonho announced his first comeback, with a new EP, which was originally intended to be released by the end of 2020, although without a set date. He pre-released a song from the upcoming EP "Flash" through his concert.

2021: Love Synonym Pt.2: Right for Us, second concert and Blue Letter 
Wonho's second part of his first EP Love Synonym Pt.2: Right for Us was released on February 26. All five songs from the EP debuted on the Billboard World Digital Song Sales chart, occupying twenty percent of the entire World Songs chart for that week.

He held an online concert WeNeedLove, through LiveXLive on March 28. During the concert, Wonho announced his intention for his next comeback in summer of 2021.

In May, Wonho released a music video for the song "Ain't About You" from his second part of his first EP, in collaboration with Kiiara.

On June 15, his American manager, Eshy Gazit announced the launch of a new label venture Intertwine, in partnership with BMG, with Monsta X and Wonho as the first two artists involved in the partnership.

On July 19, Wonho joined NCSoft's global K-pop entertainment platform Universe.

In July, it was announced that Wonho would release his debut Japanese single album on October 27, with the lead single "On the Way ～Embrace～". On August 4, he pre-released the Japanese version of the song "Lose".

Wonho released his second EP Blue Letter on September 14, with the title track "Blue".

On December 1, Wonho released the Japanese digital single "White Miracle".

2022: Facade, first musical and first solo tour 
Wonho made his comeback with his first single album Obsession on February 16, with the title track "Eye On You".

In May, Wonho became the exclusive model of a dual-formulation and diet dual-functional complex product Cent Double. 

Wonho released his third EP Facade on June 13, with the title track "Crazy".

From June 3 to July 24, Wonho is set to appear in his first musical with Equal, a work that reflects on today's chaotic times due to pandemics and conspiracy theories, set in the 17th century Europe, where witches and heresy hunts were rampant. It is a two-person play that captures the metaphor of the COVID-19 era with the desperate desires and twisted fates of Nikola and Theo, two friends driven by the fear of death and extreme loneliness. Wonho will perform as Theo, a bright and cheerful country doctor who struggles to save his friend Nikola, who is dying from an incurable disease.

On July 6, Highline released the poster and schedule for Wonho's first European tour Facade, through his official SNS. According to the schedule released with the poster, he will be in Munich and Oberhausen, Germany on August 28 and 31, respectively, Madrid, Spain on September 2, and London, England on September 4.

On August 19, Wonho released the promotional single "Don't hesitate" through Universe Music for the mobile application Universe.

In September, Wonho is preparing for the release of his second single album Bittersweet on October 14, with the title track "Don't Regret".

Personal life   
Wonho enlisted for his mandatory military service as a public service worker on December 5, 2022.

Discography

Extended plays

Single albums

Singles

As lead artist

As featured artist

Promotional singles

Other charted songs

Music videos

Filmography

Television shows

Radio shows

Music video appearances

Musicals

Songwriting
All credits are adapted from the Korea Music Copyright Association, unless stated otherwise.

Tours and concerts

European tour 
 Facade European Tour (2022)

Offline concert 
 We Are Young (2021)
 Everyday Christmas (2022)

Virtual concerts
IWonhoYou (2020)
WeNeedLove (2021)

Awards and nominations

Notes

References

External links

 

Starship Entertainment artists
South Korean male idols
21st-century South Korean male singers
South Korean pop singers
English-language singers from South Korea
Japanese-language singers of South Korea
Living people
People from Seoul
Singers from Seoul
South Korean male singer-songwriters
Monsta X members
1993 births